We Have a Ghost is 2023 American supernatural horror comedy film written and directed by Christopher Landon, based on the 2017 short story "Ernest" by Geoff Manaugh. It stars David Harbour, Jahi Winston, Tig Notaro, Jennifer Coolidge, and Anthony Mackie. It was released on February 24, 2023, by Netflix and received mixed reviews from film critics.

Plot

One year after the last owners fled in terror, the Presleys are shown a house. Suspicious of the low price, the estate agent insists that recently prices have been low. On the first night Kevin, the youngest, investigates a sound in the attic. Using his mobile phone light, a ghost appears. When he fails to scare Kevin but is instead met with a laugh, he vanishes. Kevin returns to the attic and sits down to talk with the ghost, only to discover that he is mute and does not remember his life back when he was alive. Kevin calls him Ernest as that is the name on his bowling shirt. Suddenly Kevin's big brother Fulton barges in and begins bullying Kevin for his phone, causing Ernest to help him. Fulton finds a video Kevin had recorded of Ernest when he first saw him and soon shows their father Frank that their new home is haunted by a ghost. Frank creates a YouTube channel, where the increased footage of Ernest eventually convince the public of his existence, turning the Presleys Internet-famous. 

In high school Kevin meets Joy, the neighbor, who reveals to his house as the “House of Death” due to its abandoned state. Once the video 
of Ernest goes viral, they cross paths in the library and Joy quickly finds that the house's owner Ernest S. lived there from '65 to '71 and is now residing elsewhere, but he is not the titular ghost. The West Bay cable TV medium Judy Romano comes to film meeting Ernest. Frustrated with Frank for taking advantage of Ernest and failing to connect with him, Kevin shows Ernest various horror clips to help him scare off the set. It doesn't take long for Ernest to scare her crew and eventually Judy, who, while reacting in terror, jumps out the window. Frank is furious with Kevin and Ernest, but quickly profits off of the haunting and continues to ignore Kevin’s warnings. Joy convinces Kevin that they need to take Ernest out to a bar once belonging to the house's past owner to try and jog his memory. They start to uncover the truth about Ernest's past, discovering a photo of him with the previous house owner, and a little blonde girl at the park who gives Ernest vague flashbacks. Unfortunately, he unintentionally scares the child, causing the public to believe Ernest is malevolent.

Horror writer Dr. Leslie Monroe visits Frank and Mel, telling them about an old program she ran with the CIA called Wizard Clip, with its goal  in mind to capture a ghost. When costs of the program was made known to the public they scrapped it, making her the scapegoat. When she tries to convince them that Ernest is dangerous, Frank throws her out, but the viral video of Frank at the park sets the CIA in motion. They break into the Presley home, but Kevin, Joy and Ernest have already left for Oklahoma to find the past house owner. The next morning the Presleys are coerced into doing an appeal to apprehend the trio. The broadcast comes on a convenience store TV and they outrun the many police cruisers chasing them.

Arriving at the house in Oklahoma, the man, Ernest S., identifies Ernest as Randy, the brother-in-law of Ernest S.’s wife, Ramona. He claims that Randy became a drunk, not able to cope with his wife's death from giving birth. He left his four-year-old daughter with them and disappeared. The couple did not plan to have kids initially as they preferred to travel but instead continued to raise their niece, June. Ernest makes himself visible, and the CIA swoops in. Back home, Kevin is depressed. Frank apologizes to him, recognizing he's been selfish at the family's expense, and tells Kevin he's a much better man than he is.

In the CIA facility, an aggressive agent is wearing a pin which triggers Ernest’s memory. During a visit to the house, Ramona carried June away while Ernest S. killed him with a blow to the head. Ernest is being acted upon for not complying, but Dr. Monroe rescues him, realizing he is not dangerous as well as the government’s intentions for him. Ernest S. shows up at the house to kill Kevin, believing he's helping ghost Ernest get revenge. He reveals that when Randy’s wife died, Ramona (who was infertile) plotted to murder Randy and take June for their own, with Ernest S. finishing the job for her. He chases him to the attic, where Ernest and Frank tackle him out of the window. The CIA interrogates Kevin, seeking Ernest the ghost. He doesn't divulge anything, but a flashback reveals that Kevin and Frank reunited him with his now 50+ year-old daughter June. Happy at last, Ernest finally is at peace and moves on to the afterlife, but not before sharing a heartwarming goodbye with Kevin. 

The Presleys have a new moving day, but this time only a few miles away, and Kevin and Joy are now a couple. As Kevin leaves the house, a light flickers in the attic.

Cast

In addition, Dr. Phil McGraw has a cameo appearance as himself.

Production
Production of We Have a Ghost was announced in July 2021, with Christopher Landon writing and directing, and Geoff Manaugh, on whose short story it was based, as executive producer. The cast included Anthony Mackie, David Harbour, Jahi Winston, Tig Notaro, Jennifer Coolidge, Erica Ash, Niles Fitch, Isabella Russo, Faith Ford and Steve Coulter.  Harbour was Landon's first choice for the role of Ernest; as he told Entertainment Weekly: "I knew that the role was incredibly challenging because there's no dialog, so he just has to do so much with so little. We had a meeting, and he told me he was terrified of doing it, which I thought was great because it shows that he was feeling vulnerable and intrigued and excited. By the end of our meeting, I think we both felt really strongly that it was a good match".

Principal photography began in August 2021 in Donaldsonville and New Orleans. A few weeks into filming, production was halted because of the landfall of Hurricane Ida in Louisiana. Production resumed October to finish filming scenes in the Ascension Parish west bank city.

Reception 
On review aggregator Rotten Tomatoes, the film holds an approval rating of 41% based on 68 reviews with an average rating of 5.2/10. The website's critics consensus reads, "We Have a Ghost has a fun concept and a talented cast; unfortunately, this spookily uneven 80s pastiche also has very little idea of what to do with them." On Metacritic, the film has a weighted average score of 53 out of 100, based on 23 critics, indicating "mixed or average reviews".

References

External links
 
 

2023 films
2020s English-language films
American comedy horror films
American ghost films
English-language Netflix original films
Films based on American short stories
Films directed by Christopher B. Landon
Films scored by Bear McCreary
2020s American films
2020s ghost films
2023 horror films
Temple Hill Entertainment films